Physella is a genus of small, left-handed or sinistral, air-breathing freshwater snails, aquatic pulmonate gastropod mollusks in the family Physidae.

These snails eat algae, diatoms and other detritus.

Shell description
Snails in the family Physidae have shells that are sinistral, which means that if the shell is held with the spire pointing up and the aperture facing the observer, the aperture is on the left-hand side.

The shells of Physella species have a long and large aperture, a pointed spire, and no operculum. The shells are thin and corneous and rather transparent.

Species
Species in the genus include:

 Physella acuta (Draparnaud, 1805) - Pewter Physa, type species, synonyms: Physella heterostropha (Say, 1817), Physella integra (Haldeman, 1841)
 Physella ancillaria (Say, 1825) 
 Physella bermudezi (Aguayo, 1935) - Lowdome Physa
 Physella bottimeri (Clench, 1924) - Comanche Physa
 Physella boucardi (Crosse & P. Fischer, 1881) - Desert Physa
 Physella columbiana (Hemphill, 1890) - Rotund Physa
 Physella conoidea (P. Fischer & Crosse, 1886) - Texas Physa
 Physella cooperi (Tryon, 1865) - Olive Physa
 Physella costata (Newcomb, 1861) - Ornate Physa
 Physella cubensis (Pfeiffer, 1839)
 Physella globosa (Haldeman, 1841) - Globose Physa
 Physella gyrina (Say, 1821)
 Physella hendersoni (Clench, 1925)
 Physella hordacea (I. Lea, 1864) - Grain Physa
 Physella humerosa (Gould, 1855) - Corkscrew Physa
 Physella johnsoni (Clench, 1926) - Banff Springs Snail
 Physella lordi (Baird, 1863) - Twisted Physa
 Physella magnalacustris (Walker, 1901)
 Physella mexicana (Philippi, 1841) - Polished Physa
 Physella microstriata (Chamberlin & E. G. Berry, 1930)
 Physella natricina Taylor, 1988
 Physella osculans (Haldeman, 1841) - Cayuse Physa
 Physella parkeri (Currier, 1881) - Broadshoulder Physa
 Physella propinqua (Tryon, 1865) - Rocky Mountain Physa
 Physella sayi
 Physella spelunca (Turner & Clench, 1974)
 Physella squalida (Morelet, 1851) - Squalid Physa
 Physella traski (I. Lea, 1864) - Sculpted Physa
 Physella utahensis (Clench, 1925)
 Physella vinosa (Gould, 1847) - Banded Physa
 Physella virgata (Gould, 1855)
 Physella virginea (Gould, 1847) - Sunset Physa
 Physella winnipegensis ..., 2004
 Physella wrighti Te & Clarke, 1985
 Physella zionis (Pilsbry, 1926)

See also 
 Physa

References

Physidae
Taxa named by Samuel Stehman Haldeman